Five Minutes with Arctic Monkeys is the debut single by English rock band Arctic Monkeys, released on 30 May 2005 by Bang Bang Recordings.

Background
Released on 30 May 2005, it featured a re-recording of fan favourite "Fake Tales of San Francisco" and new song and B-side "From the Ritz to the Rubble". It was a limited release by Bang Bang Recordings – a label created by the band for the sole purpose of releasing the single. The name, Bang Bang, was mooted as a replacement band name, on the basis that the name Arctic Monkeys sounded "silly".

Only 1500 CDs and 1500 vinyl copies were made available, meaning the single is now rare and increasingly sought after by fans of the band. Both tracks were re-recorded and included on the band's debut album, Whatever People Say I Am, That's What I'm Not (2006).

Track listing

Bang Bang Recordings Limited
The record label Bang Bang Recordings Limited was originally established on 31 May 2005 and the purposed registration office was located at 1 Conduit Street in London. The official director as well as the secretary of the company resigned the day after on 1 June 2005. Arctic Monkeys signed a contract with the record label Domino Records later that month. The official founder of the company is unknown to this day. Bang Bang Recordings was later taken over by the manager of Arctic Monkeys, Ian McAndrew and is still owned by him to this day. The current registered location of Bang Bang Recordings is 41 Great Portland Street in London.

Personnel
Alex Turner – lead vocals, lead guitar
Jamie Cook – rhythm guitar, backing vocals
Andy Nicholson – bass guitar, backing vocals
Matt Helders – drums, backing vocals

References

2005 debut singles
Arctic Monkeys albums